The 2017 Utah Utes football team represented the University of Utah during the 2017 NCAA Division I FBS football season. The team was coached by thirteenth-year head coach Kyle Whittingham and played their home games in Rice-Eccles Stadium in Salt Lake City, Utah. They competed as members of the South Division of the Pac-12 Conference. They finished the season 7–6, 3–6 in Pac-12 play to finish in fifth place in the South Division. They were invited to the Heart of Dallas Bowl where they defeated West Virginia.

Schedule
Utah announced their 2017 football schedule on January 18, 2017. The Utes played FCS North Dakota, in-state rival BYU, and San Jose State in out-of-conference play. In Pac-12 conference play, the Utes did not play cross-divisional foes California and Oregon State.

Source:

Game summaries

North Dakota

at BYU

San Jose State

at Arizona

Stanford

at USC

Arizona State

at Oregon

UCLA

Washington State

at Washington

Colorado

vs. West Virginia (Heart of Dallas Bowl)

Rankings

Coaching staff

Source:

References

Utah
Utah Utes football seasons
First Responder Bowl champion seasons
Utah Utes football